Mount Tumbine is a mountain in northern Mozambique.

It lies in Milange District of Zambézia Province, immediately east of the town of Milange. The Ruo River, which forms the border between Mozambique and Malawi, runs north of the mountain, separating it from the larger Mulanje Massif in Malawi. It is surrounded by plains on the east, south, and west.

The mountain consists of a nearly circular intrusion of syenite, 8 km in diameter. It is similar in structure and composition to the nearby Mulanje Massif.

Tea is grown on the slopes of Mt. Tumbine. Patches of native montane forest survive on the mountain.

References

Tumbine
Tumbine
Tumbine
Tumbine